Les Nomades is a French restaurant in the Streeterville neighborhood of Chicago.

In its critique, the Michelin Guide notes the restaurant's "particularly interesting wine list." The owner is Mary Beth Liccioni, and Roland Liccioni is the chef de cuisine. Zagat rated the food 4.9 out of 5.

Clientele
Milton Rosenberg dined at the restaurant.

Dress code
Les Nomades requires men to wear a suit or sport coat in the restaurant.

Influence
Classically trained chef Chris Nugent had a seven-year tenure at Les Nomades prior to opening prix fixe restaurant  Goosefoot in Lincoln Square, Chicago.

See also
Alinea
Spiaggia
Oriole
List of Michelin starred restaurants in Chicago

References 

European restaurants in Chicago
French restaurants in Illinois